Ek Baap Chhe Bete is a 1978 Bollywood film directed by Mehmood. The film stars Yogeeta Bali.

Cast
Yogeeta Bali   
I. S. Johar   
Shubha Khote   
Mehmood
Pucky Ali
Lucky Ali
Macky Ali
Nutan Behl (Guest appearance)  
Jaya Bhaduri (Guest appearance)    
Moushumi Chatterji (Guest appearance)

Music
"Ghadi Milan Ki Aayi Aayi Tu Chhuti Lekar Aaja" – Mohammed Rafi, Sulakshana Pandit
"Daddy Don't Go" – Kishore Kumar
"Buddhe Teri Chaal Buddhe" – Lucky Ali, Vijeta Pandit, Mehmood, Sulakshana Pandit
"Ek Baap Aur Chhe Bete" – Kishore Kumar
"Walking And I`m Walking All Alone" – Lucky Ali

References

External links
 

1978 films
1970s Hindi-language films
Films scored by Rajesh Roshan